Wilfersdorf Castle is located in the Weinviertel (wine district) in the town of Wilfersdorf, in the Mistelbach district. The castle has been continuously owned by the Liechtenstein family and serves today as the property management offices of the princely estate in Weinviertel. It is renowned for its princely cellars.

History 

Around 1600, Gundakar of Liechtenstein had to rebuild a pre-existing Gothic castle as a four-winged water chateau. Around 1802, Prince Alois I of Liechtenstein had the northern, southern and eastern wings removed. The remainder of the castle was ravaged by the French in 1809 and in 1866 the Prussians established a field hospital there. At the end of the Second World War, the castle suffered significant damage. Repairs were conducted over a period of many years. Between 2001 and 2002, existing buildings were restored.

Today 

The main building is now a cultural and exhibition centre. A multipurpose social hall on the ground floor provides space for seminars, presentations and small conferences. A large collection of documentation on the history of the Liechtenstein family is also displayed on this floor. The castle cellar can be found in the basement.
The Wilfersdorf National History Museum is located in the adjoining building.

External links 

House of Liechtenstein
Castles in Lower Austria